Malaria is a 1919 German silent film directed by Rochus Gliese and starring Lyda Salmonova, Emil Kühne, and Ewald Bach.

Cast
 Lyda Salmonova as Solotänzerin Tatjana Sergeijowna  
 Emil Kühne as Pope Sergej  
 Ewald Bach as Dr. Fjodr Gawrilowitsch Schuwalow  
 Martin Lübbert as Dr. Boris Michailowitsch Nawaschin 
 Adele Sandrock as Tatjanas Amme Anuschka  
 Raoul Lange as Fürst Dimitrij 
 Friedrich Kühne as  
 Ernst Waldow as Laboratoriumsdiener Wassjka 
 Eddie Seefeld 
 Ballett Charell

References

Bibliography
 Thomas Elsaesser & Michael Wedel. The BFI companion to German cinema. British Film Institute, 1999.

External links

1919 films
Films of the Weimar Republic
Films directed by Rochus Gliese
German silent feature films
German black-and-white films
1910s German films